Donald R. Blake is an American chemist currently a Distinguished Professor at University of California, Irvine and an Elected Fellow of the American Association for the Advancement of Science and American Geophysical Union.

References

Year of birth missing (living people)
Living people
University of California, Irvine faculty
21st-century American chemists
University of California, Irvine alumni
University of California, Los Angeles alumni